Salt North is a barony in County Kildare, Ireland.

Etymology
Salt North derives its name from the Latin name of Leixlip: Saltus salmonis (literally "salmon leap"; the English name is derived from Old Norse Lax-hlaup). This makes Salt one of very few Irish placenames derived directly from Latin.

Location

Salt North barony is located in the north-eastern corner of County Kildare, north of the River Liffey and east of the Lyreen River. It borders County Meath to the north and  Fingla to the east.

History

The Uí Gabla sept of the Dál Chormaic is noted early in Salt North. Ó Gelbroin is found as a chief of Mag Life on the plains of the river Liffey here. There was originally a single Salt barony, divided into north and south baronies before 1807.

List of settlements

Below is a list of settlements in North Salt:
Celbridge
Leixlip
Maynooth
Straffan

Below is a list of civil parishes in North Salt:
Leixlip (civil parish)
Confey
Donaghcumper
Laraghbryan

References

Baronies of County Kildare